The Saudi Arabia national basketball team is the national basketball team representing the Kingdom of Saudi Arabia. It is administrated by the Saudi Arabian Basketball Federation.

Its biggest success has been the Bronze medal at the 1999 Asian Championship. The team last qualified for the 2022 FIBA Asia Cup.

Competition records

Summer Olympics
yet to qualify

FIBA World championships
yet to qualify

FIBA Asia Cup

Asian Games

1951-74 : Did Not Qualify
1978 : 12th
1982-86 : Did Not Qualify
1990 : 9th
1994 : 7th
1998-2010 : Did Not Qualify
2014 : 13th
2018 : Did Not Qualify
2022 : To Be Determined

Islamic Solidarity Games

2005 : 6th
2013 : 5th
Beginning with the 2017 event, regular basketball was replaced by 3x3 basketball.

Arab Nations Championship

1974-1975 : ?
1978 : 
1981-1994 : ?
1997 : 
1999-2005 : ?
2007 : 
2008 : 5th
2009 : 7th
2010-2011 : ?
2015 : 4th
2017 : 4th
2018 : 
2020 : To Be Determined

Pan Arab Games

1953-1992 : ?
1997 : 
1999-2004 : ? 
2007 : 8th
2011 : 11th
2021 : To Be Determined

Team

Current roster

2021 FIBA Asia Cup qualification
Due to the COVID-19 pandemic, the FIBA Executive Committee decided that for the 2020 November window games will be held at a single venue under a bubble format.

Venue: Al-Gharafa Sports Club Multi-Purpose Hall, Doha

Opposition: Iran  (28 November)
Opposition: Qatar  (30 November)

Depth chart

Past rosters
2021 FIBA Asia Cup qualification
Opposition: Qatar  (20 February)
Venue: King Abdullah Sports City, Jeddah
Opposition: Syria  (23 February)
Venue: King Abdullah Sports City, Jeddah

In February 2020, at the 2021 FIBA Asia Cup qualification games, Khalid Abdel-Gabar averaged most minutes, points and assists for Saudi Arabia.

2018 FIBA Asia Cup Pre-qualifiers  Squad:

<noinclude>

2017 Arab Nations Basketball Championship Squad:

<noinclude>

2012 Squad:

2014 Asian Games Squad:

Head coach position
 Lofti Chikhaoui – 2011
 Nenad Krdzic – 2013
 Abdulrahim Akhtar – 2014
 Mensur Bajramovic – 2017
 Ali Alsanhani – 2018 
 Johan Roijakkers – 2022

See also
Saudi Arabia national under-19 basketball team
Saudi Arabia national under-17 basketball team
Saudi Arabia national 3x3 team
Saudi Arabia women's national basketball team

References

External links
Saudi Arabia Basketball Records at FIBA Archive
Asia-basket - Saudi Arabia Men National Team
Saudi Basketball Federation on Instagram

Videos
 #FIBAAsia - Day 1: Saudi Arabia v Philippines (highlights) Youtube.com video

 
Basketball teams established in 1964
1964 establishments in Saudi Arabia